Lakeside is an American funk band, best known for their 1980 number one R&B hit, "Fantastic Voyage".

Band history

Formation and early years
In 1969, guitarist Stephen Shockley from Dayton, Ohio formed a group called the Young Underground after he had departed a group known as the Monterreys. Vocalist Mark Woods, who was a member of another local band called the Nomads, joined up with Shockley's band. In 1971, the Nomads and the Young Underground took on a new, singular identity: With the addition of Thomas Shelby and Mark Wood's sister Shirley Wood, they became Ohio Lakeside Express.

In 1971, the group became acquainted with Eddie Thomas of Curtom, a record label owned and operated by Mr. Thomas and his partner, Curtis Mayfield. Eddie Thomas left Curtom to form his own label: "Lakeside", which he named after the south-side of Chicago. Lakeside (the record label) signed Ohio Lakeside Express. Eddie Thomas had a number of producers expressing interest in producing an album for Lakeside, but nothing materialized at this stage in their career. That would soon change, as Shirley chose not to pursue her singing career - so they added Ricky Abernathy as a new singer.

At "Mavericks Flats", another of the big-time venues of the day, by now they added another vocalist (Otis Stokes) to replace Ricky Abernathy, and a new percussionist (Fred Lewis). The group was seen by Dick Griffey, a promoter handling successful artists like Stevie Wonder. Impressed by the group, he offered his friendship and advice, and began informally managing Lakeside in early 1975. It was also in 1974 that Lakeside met Frank Wilson and signed a deal with Motown. Motown was promoting and prioritizing other groups, and shelved what they had produced for Lakeside.

When Frank Wilson left Motown in 1976 for ABC Dunhill, he formed his own production company called Spec-O-Lite Productions and signed Lakeside after convincing them to drop the "Ohio" and "Express".

In 1977, Lakeside's success began to accelerate. That year, the group released their eponymous debut album, which featured the single "If I Didn't Have You". About this time the group debuted on Soul Train, performing a Beloyd Taylor and Peter Cor composition "Shine On", which helped pave the way for future success. As Lakeside added barefoot drummer Fred Alexander, Jr., the band was approached by Whitfield Records, Motown, and Solar Records. Lakeside chose Solar Records, owned by Dick Griffey, with stable mates The Whispers, Shalamar, Midnight Star, Klymaxx, and Carrie Lucas.

Major label success
Dick Griffey, the producer who had befriended and managed Lakeside since 1975, started Solar Records in 1978. At that same time, Norman Whitfield had been courting the group to sign with his Whitfield Records, but Griffey offered the group a chance to write and co-produce their own music, which Whitfield was not willing to do.

Parting amicably with Frank Wilson, Lakeside became a part of the Solar family. The band released their next album, Shot of Love later in 1978. Their first Solar album featured songs all written by members of the band and co-produced with Solar staff producer, Leon Sylvers III. With this album, the band began to find major success on the R&B charts, when the single "It's All the Way Live" reached number 4.

The band, at this point consisting of bassist Marvin Craig, drummer Fred Alexander, percussionist Fred Lewis, guitarist Steve Shockley, keyboardist Norman Beavers, guitarist/multi-instrumentalist and lead vocalist Otis Stokes, lead vocalist/keyboardist Mark Wood, occasional lead vocalists Tiemeyer McCain and Thomas Shelby found their niche with a sound that stemmed from years of playing together. The band dressed in costumes on their album covers, including pirates, 1920s police officers, cowboys, Arabian knights, and even Robin Hood.

Despite the success of Shot of Love and "It's All the Way Live", the next album, Rough Riders, did not fare as well. However, the following album, 1980s Fantastic Voyage, exceeded all expectations. Its single, "Fantastic Voyage" went to reach number one on the R&B chart. The tune remains the band's biggest hit, also hitting the pop charts (their only single to do so), where it peaked at number 55. Fantastic Voyage was certified Gold and remains the group's greatest achievement, and it eventually went Platinum. They followed this hit up with a remake of the Beatles' song, "I Want to Hold Your Hand", which made the R&B top ten again.

Subsequent to the Fantastic Voyage album, Lakeside went on to release six more successful albums. More hits on the R&B charts, such as "Raid" (1983) and "Outrageous" (1984) kept the group going, until their change in the late 1980s. "Bullseye" (1987) became the group's last major hit, as the New Jack Swing boom began taking over the airwaves.

Tyrone Griffin - one of the later members of Lakeside - has a son in the music industry, Tyrone Griffin, Jr. - known to the public as singer Ty Dolla Sign.

Recent appearance
The Rose Music Center in Huber Heights held a benefit concert on September 18, 2019, that raised more than $109,000 to help survivors of the Memorial Day tornado. Performers included the Ohio Players, Zapp, Steve Arrington, and the Original Lakeside.

Band membership

"Classic" line-up
Mark Adam Wood, Jr.: lead vocals, piano? 1969–2015
Tiemeyer McCain: vocals; 1969–1986
Thomas Shelby: vocals; 1970–1983, 2007–present
Stephen Shockley: lead guitar; 1969–present
Norman Beavers: keyboards; 1969–1987, ????–present
Marvin Craig: bass guitar; 1973–present
Fred Lewis: percussion; 1974–present
Otis Stokes: guitars, bass, lead vocals; 1975–1986, ????–present
Fred Alexander, Jr: drums; 1977–present

Other members
Brian Marbury: 1969–1970 (d. 2009)
Tony White: 1969–1970
Vincent Beavers: 1969–1975
Terry Williams: 1969–1975
Ricky Abernathy: 1969–1975
Shirley Wood: 1970–1971
Johnny Rogers: ????–present
Will Shelby: 1993–2021 (d. 2021)
Donald Tavie: 1985–2011 (d. 2011)
Barrington Henderson: 1986–1995
Larry Bolden: 1989–1996
 Floyd Bailey: 1975–1977
 Tyrone Griffin, Sr: 1983–1997
 Dale E. Wilson, Sr: 1969–1977
 Roc Phizzle: 2018–present

Discography

Albums

Singles

References

External links
 Lakeside at Discogs.
 Lakeside on AllMusic

Funk musical groups from Dayton, Ohio
American boogie musicians
American soul musical groups
SOLAR Records artists